The Incomparable Charley Pride is a compilation album by country singer Charley Pride, released on the RCA Camden label in August 1972. The album reached number 16 on the Billboard Top Country Albums chart and number 189 on the Billboard 200.

Unlike other Camden albums, often known for presenting an artist's older material, the emphasis on this album is on tracks from the then-recently-released Pride RCA albums "Charley Pride Sings Heart Songs" (1971), "From Me To You" (1970), "I'm Just Me" (1971), "Did You Think To Pray" (1971), and "A Sunshiny Day With Charley Pride" (1972).

Track listing
Side One
"I'd Rather Love You" (Johnny Duncan)
"Time (You're Not a Friend of Mine)" (Sue Lane)
"Jeanie Norman" (Dale Morris)
"Anywhere (Just Inside Your Arms)" (Wanda Ballman)
"When the Trains Come In" (Al Urban)

Side Two
"Piroque Joe" (Roy Botkin)
"Was It All Worth Losing You" (Audie Murphy)
"Instant Loneliness" (Johnny Duncan)
"This Highway Leads to Glory" (Lassaye Holmes)
"Time Out for Jesus" (Ann J. Morton)

References

1972 compilation albums
Charley Pride albums
albums produced by Jack Clement
RCA Camden compilation albums